Santa Ana, officially the Municipality of Santa Ana, is a 3rd class municipality in the province of Pampanga, Philippines. According to the 2020 census, it has a population of 61,537 people.

Geography

Barangays
Santa Ana is politically subdivided into 14 barangays. All of its barangays were named after various Christian patrons, although some townsfolk still use their former names.

 San Agustin (Sumpung)
 San Bartolome (Patayum)
 San Isidro (Quenabuan)
 San Joaquin (Poblacion, Canukil)
 San Jose (Catmun)
 San Juan (Tinajeru)
 San Nicolas (Sepung Ilug)
 San Pablo (Darabulbul)
 San Pedro (Calumpang)
 San Roque (Tuclung)
 Santa Lucia (Calinan)
 Santa Maria (Balen Bayu)
 Santiago (Barrio Libutad)
 Santo Rosario (Pagbatuan)

Climate

Demographics

Economy

Government
The municipal government is divided into three branches: executive, legislative and judiciary. The judicial branch is administered solely by the Supreme Court of the Philippines. The executive branch is composed of the mayor and the barangay captain for the barangays. The legislative branch is composed of the Sangguniang Bayan (town assembly), Sangguniang Barangay (barangay council), and the Sangguniang Kabataan for the youth sector.

Education

Private schools 

 Holy Cross College (Pampanga) 
 Saint Mary's Angels College of Pampanga
 Adelle Grace Montesorri School Inc.  Santa Ana

Public secondary schools 

 Sta Ana National High School
 San Isidro High School
 Telesforo and Natividad Alfonso High School

Elementary schools 

 Fulgencio Matias Elementary School – San Joaquin
 San Juan/San Pedro Elementary School – San Pedro
 San Agustin Elementary School – San Agustin
 Sto Rosario Elementary School – Sto Rosario
 San Roque Elementary School – San Roque
 San Pablo Elementary School – San Pablo
 Santiago Elementary School – Santiago
 San Isidro Elementary School – San Isidro
 San Nicolas Elementary School – San Nicolas
 Sta Lucia Elementary School – Sta Lucia
 Sta Maria Elementary School – Sta Maria
 Sta. Ana Elementary School - Sta. Lucia, Sta. Ana

Gallery

References

External links

 Santa Ana Profile at PhilAtlas.com
 [ Philippine Standard Geographic Code]
Philippine Census Information
Local Governance Performance Management System

Municipalities of Pampanga